The 51st New Zealand Parliament was elected at the 2014 general election. This Parliament consists of 121 members (120 seats plus one overhang seat) and was in place from September 2014 until August 2017, followed by the 2017 New Zealand general election. Following the final vote count John Key was able to continue to lead the Fifth National Government.

The Parliament was elected using a mixed-member proportional representation (MMP) voting system. Members of Parliament (MPs) represent 71 geographical electorates: 16 in the South Island, 48 in the North Island and 7 Māori electorates. The remaining members were elected from party lists using the Sainte-Laguë method to realise proportionality. The number of geographical electorates was increased from 70 at the previous election, to account for New Zealand's increasing population.

Electorate boundaries for 51st Parliament

The Representation Commission is tasked with reviewing electorate boundaries every five years following each New Zealand census.

The next census was scheduled for 8 March 2011, but it was postponed due to the disruption caused by the 2011 Christchurch earthquake on 22 February . The census was formally conducted on 5 March 2013 with additional data collection over the following several weeks, Following the census it was determined there would be sufficient time to conduct a boundary review of all electorates.

The boundaries were redrawn based on population distribution and the Māori electoral option, where people of Māori descent can opt to be either on the general or the Māori roll. By law, the South Island must have 16 general electorates, with the number of North Island general and Māori electorates being the respective population in each group divided by one-sixteenth of the South Island general electorate population, within a tolerance of five percent. At the 2011 election, there were 47 North Island general electorates and seven Māori electorates, totalling 70 electorates across the country.

Following significant consultation final boundaries were released by the Representation Commission on 17 April 2014. The 2014 general election was conducted under these boundaries on 20 September 2014. The increase in population in the Auckland region as recorded in the 2013 census meant an extra electorate was required to keep all electorates within five percent of their quota. To accommodate an extra electorate the Electoral Commission proposed major changes in West Auckland by abolishing the Waitakere electorate and establishing two new electorates, namely Kelston and Upper Harbour. Boundaries within Christchurch changed substantially, with several electorates growing and decreasing due to population movement around the city since the 2010–11 Christchurch earthquakes.

2014 general election

Officeholders

Speakers
 Speaker of the House of Representatives: Rt. Hon. David Carter
 Deputy Speaker: Hon. Chester Borrows
 Assistant Speaker: Lindsay Tisch
 Assistant Speaker: Hon. Trevor Mallard

Other parliamentary officers
 Clerk:
 David Wilson (from 6 July 2015)
 Mary Winifred Harris (until 5 July 2015)
 Serjeant-at-Arms:
 Steve Streefkerk (from July 2016)
 Brent Smith (until 18 March 2016)

Party leaders
 Prime Minister of New Zealand (National):
 Rt. Hon. John Key (until 12 December 2016)
 Rt. Hon. Bill English (from 12 December 2016)
 Deputy Prime Minister of New Zealand (National):
 Hon. Bill English (until 12 December 2016)
 Hon. Paula Bennett (from 12 December 2016)
 Leader of the Opposition (Labour):
 Andrew Little (18 November 2014 - 1 August 2017)
 Jacinda Ardern (from 1 August 2017)
 Deputy Leader of the Opposition (Labour):
 Hon. Annette King (18 November 2014 - 7 March 2017)
 Jacinda Ardern (7 March - 1 August 2017)
 Kelvin Davis (from 1 August 2017)
 Co-leaders of the Green Party of Aotearoa New Zealand:
 Male Co-leader:
 Russel Norman (until 30 May 2015)
 James Shaw (from 30 May 2015)
 Female Co-leader:
 Metiria Turei (until 9 August 2017)
 Vacant (from 9 August 2017)
 Leader of New Zealand First: Rt. Hon. Winston Peters
 Deputy Leader of New Zealand First: 
 Tracey Martin (until 2 July 2015)
 Ron Mark (from 3 July 2015)
 Co-leaders of the Māori Party:
 Male co-leader of the Party: Hon. Te Ururoa Flavell
 Female co-leader of the Party: Marama Fox
 Leader of ACT New Zealand: David Seymour
 Leader of United Future:
 Hon. Peter Dunne (until 23 August 2017)
 Damian Light (from 23 August 2017, acting outside the House)

Floor leaders
 Leader of the House (National):
 Hon. Gerry Brownlee (until 2 May 2017)
 Hon. Simon Bridges (from 2 May 2017)
 Shadow Leader of the House (Labour): Chris Hipkins

Whips

 Senior Government (National) Whip: 
 Jami-Lee Ross (from 2 May 2017)
 Tim Macindoe (until 2 May 2017)
 Junior Government Whip:
 Barbara Kuriger (from 2 May 2017)
 Jami-Lee Ross (until 2 May 2017)
 Third Government Whip:
 Matt Doocey (from 2 May 2017)
 Barbara Kuriger (7 February - 2 May 2017)
 Jo Hayes (until 7 February 2017)
 Senior Opposition (Labour) Whip: 
 Kris Faafoi (from 15 December 2016)
 Chris Hipkins (until 15 December 2016)
 Junior Opposition Whip: Carmel Sepuloni
 Assistant Opposition Whip: Kris Faafoi (30 November 2015 - 15 December 2016)
 Green Party Whip (Musterer): David Clendon (until 8 August 2017)
 New Zealand First Whip: Barbara Stewart
 Associate Whip: Clayton Mitchell (from 3 July 2015)

Members
The tables below show the members of the 51st Parliament based on preliminary counts of the 2014 general election.

Overview
The table below shows the number of MPs in each party following the 2014 election and at dissolution:

Notes
 The Māori Party, United Future and ACT once again entered into confidence and supply agreements to form a majority, as they did in the previous two parliaments.
The Working Government majority is calculated as all Government MPs less all other parties.

New Zealand National Party (60)
The National Party won 47.04% of the vote, entitling it to 60 seats. As it won 41 electorates, an additional 19 members were taken from the party list. After the resignation of Northland MP Mike Sabin a by-election was held and lost to New Zealand First. The party's share of seats was reduced to 59.
 
15 new National Party members were elected, nine from electorates and six from the list. 45 members from the 50th Parliament were returned.

New Zealand Labour Party (32)
The Labour Party won 25.13% of the vote, entitling it to 32 seats. As it won 27 electorates, an additional 5 members were taken from the party list. After the resignation of David Shearer in December 2016, the party's share of seats was reduced to 31 until Raymond Huo was sworn in in March 2017.

Three new Labour Party members were elected from the list. 29 members from the 50th Parliament were returned.

Green Party of Aotearoa New Zealand (14)
The Green Party won 10.7% of the vote, entitling it to 14 seats. As it did not win any electorate, all members were taken from the party list.

One new Green Party members were elected, with thirteen members from the 50th Parliament returning.

New Zealand First (11)
New Zealand First won 8.66% of the vote, entitling it to eleven seats from the party list. An additional seat was gained for the party when Winston Peters won the Northland by-election.

Māori Party (2)
The Māori Party won 1.32% of the vote, which is short of the 5% threshold. However, the Māori Party won an electorate and will thus be represented by one electorate MP. The 1.32% party vote share entitles the party to two seats, including an MP from the party list.

United Future (1)
United Future won 0.22% of the vote, which is short of the 5% threshold. United Future won one electorate and will thus be represented by one electorate MP. Because the 0.22% party vote share would not entitle United Future to any seats, the size of the 51st Parliament was increased to 121 seats.

ACT New Zealand (1)
ACT New Zealand won 0.69% of the vote, which is short of the 5% threshold. ACT won one electorate and was thus represented by one electorate MP. The 0.69% party vote share entitled the party to one seat.

Demographics of elected MPs

Summary of changes during term
The following changes occurred in the 51st Parliament:

 These changes occurred as a result of the elevation of Winston Peters and Jacinda Ardern from their respective party lists to being elected to an electorate seat. 
 The resignations of John Key and David Cunliffe took place less than six months before the next general election and therefore by-elections to fill the vacancies were not required.

Seating plan

Start of term 
The chamber is in a horseshoe-shape.

End of term 
The chamber is in a horseshoe-shape.

See also
Opinion polling for the 2017 New Zealand general election
Politics of New Zealand

References

New Zealand parliaments
2014 elections in New Zealand